The 1988 Kansas Jayhawks football team represented the University of Kansas as a member of the Big Eight Conference during the 1988 NCAA Division I-A football season. Led by first-year head coach Glen Mason, the Jayhawks compiled an overall record of 1–10 with a mark of 1–6 in conference play, placing seventh in the Big 8. The team played home games at Memorial Stadium in Lawrence, Kansas.

Schedule

Personnel

Season summary

at Oklahoma

Willie Vaughn set school record for career touchdown receptions.

Kansas State

at Oklahoma State

Missouri

References

Kansas
Kansas Jayhawks football seasons
Kansas Jayhawks football